Walter Dean Bryan (December 23, 1933 – March 6, 2020) was an American football player who played for the Baltimore Colts of the National Football League (NFL). He played college football at Tarleton State University and Texas Tech University.

He died on March 6, 2020, in Abilene, Texas at the age of 86.

References

1933 births
2020 deaths
People from Olney, Texas
Players of American football from Texas
American football defensive backs
Tarleton State Texans football players
Texas Tech Red Raiders football players
Baltimore Colts players